

The Fanaero-Chile Chincol (named for a South American sparrow) was a prototype trainer aircraft developed in Chile in 1955 for air force use. It was a conventional, low-wing cantilever monoplane of mixed construction, with fabric covered wooden wings and tail surfaces (making extensive use of Mañío, an indigenous wood). It was fitted with a fixed tailwheel undercarriage and was powered by a single  Continental O-470 air-cooled horizontally-opposed piston engine. The pilot and instructor sat in tandem, and were enclosed under a long canopy. The prototype Chincol made its maiden flight on 14 December 1955. The Chilean Air Force responded positively to the design, and placed an order for 50 machines. However, technical problems significantly delayed manufacture, and the order was cancelled before the aircraft were produced.

Specifications

References

External links
 Уголок неба

1950s Chilean military trainer aircraft
Chincol
Low-wing aircraft
Single-engined tractor aircraft